The women's individual pursuit competition at the 2019  UEC European Track Championships was held on 18 October 2019.

Results

Qualifying
The first two racers raced for gold, the third and fourth fastest rider raced for the bronze medal.

Finals

References

Women's individual pursuit
European Track Championships – Women's individual pursuit